The County of Mortain was a medieval county in France centered on the town of Mortain. A choice landholding, usually either kept within the family of the duke of Normandy (or the king of France) or granted to a noble in return for service and favor. This was the main reason Mortain had so many counts, as shown below, during its long history.

Norman counts of Mortain
 Mauger of Corbeil (988–1032)
 (1032–1048)
 Robert, Count of Mortain (1049–1104)
 William, Count of Mortain (1104–1106)
 Robert II of Vitré (1106–1112)
 Stephen of England (1112–1135)
 Eustace IV of Boulogne (1135–1141)
 Geoffrey of Anjou (1141–1144)
 William of Blois (1154–1159)
 Vacant
 Marie of Boulogne and Matthew of Alsace (1167–1173)
 Vacant
 John I of England (1189–1199)
 Ida, Countess of Boulogne and Renaud de Dammartin (1204–1216)
 Matilda II of Boulogne  (1216–1245) and...
 Philip Hurepel (1216–1233)
 Afonso III of Portugal (1238–1245)
 Jeanne de Dammartin (1245–1251) and ..
 Walter of Châtillon (1245–1250)
 Vacant
 Joan II of Navarre (1328–1349)
 Vacant
 Peter d'Évreux (1401–1412)
 Catherine of Alençon (1412–1416) (his widow) and..
 Louis, Duke of Guyenne (1412–1413)
 Louis VII of Bavaria, Duke of Bavaria-Ingolstadt (1413–1416)
 Jean Dunois (1416–1417) and..
 Charles of Le Maine (1416–1417)
 Charles of Valois, Duke of Berry (1416–1417)

English counts of Mortain
 Edward Holland (1418–1419)
 Thomas Langholme (1419–?)
 John of Lancaster, 1st Duke of Bedford (?–1435)
 Edmund Beaufort, 2nd Duke of Somerset (1435–1449)

French counts of Mortain
 Charles of Le Maine (1449–1472)
 Charles IV, Duke of Anjou (1472–1481)
 Royal Domain
 Louis II, Duke of Montpensier (1529–1582)
 Francis, Duke of Montpensier (1582–1592)
 Henri de Bourbon, duc de Montpensier (1592–1608)
 Marie de Bourbon, duchesse de Montpensier (1608–1627) and..
 Gaston de France, duc d'Orléans (1626–1660) (her widower)
 Anne Marie Louise d'Orléans, duchesse de Montpensier (1660–1693)
 Philippe de France, duc d'Orléans (1693–1701)
 Philippe II d'Orléans, duc d'Orléans (1701–1723)
 Louis d'Orléáns, duc d'Orléans (1723–1752)
 Louis Philippe I d'Orléans, duc d'Orléans (1752–1785)
 Louis Philippe II d'Orléans, duc d'Orléans (1785–1786)
 Royal Domain
 Henri d'Orléans, comte de Paris, duc de France (1984–2019) (never recognised it as his main title)

Notes

 
Mortain